She Done Him Right is a 1933 short animated cartoon by Walter Lantz Productions. It is the 13th and final short of the Pooch the Pup series.

Plot
Based on the same plot as the film She Done Him Wrong, this seven-minute short features the main characters as canines.  A popular singer named Poodles is coming to town, and everybody is excited. Pooch too is excited but has romantic feelings for the performer as well. Upon seeing his love interest come by in a stage coach, Pooch, on his bicycle, comes up from behind to greet her.

At the show which is held at a night club, Poodles sings the jazz song "Minnie the Moocher's Wedding Day" (by Harold Arlen and Ted Koehler). Still madly in love with her, Pooch tries to approach the singer even on stage. This continued until he is pulled and kicked out of the club. Minutes later, Poodles' desperate former lover comes by to take her away. The singer refuses to go but the former lover carries her away in the stage coach. Pooch, who is outside, hears her cries for help, and rides to her rescue.

On his bike, Pooch chases the stage coach into a tunnel where a scuffle occurs. When they finally come out, the ex-lover ends up pulling the coach like a horse. Inside the carriage, Pooch is happy to be with his love interest at last. He and Poodles kiss each other.

Notes
The short is available on The Woody Woodpecker and Friends Classic Cartoon Collection: Volume 2 DVD box set.

The short is also a parody of the film She Done Him Wrong.

References

External links
She Done Him Right at the Big Cartoon Database
She Done Him Right at the Internet Movie Database

1933 films
1933 comedy films
American black-and-white films
1930s English-language films
Animated films about music and musicians
Films directed by Walter Lantz
Walter Lantz Productions shorts
1930s American animated films
American comedy films
Animated films about dogs
Universal Pictures short films
Universal Pictures animated short films